Brian Pittman (born 17 June 1930) is an Australian cricketer. He played in one first-class match for South Australia in 1959/60.

See also
 List of South Australian representative cricketers

References

External links
 

1930 births
Living people
Australian cricketers
South Australia cricketers
Cricketers from Adelaide